Aleana Young is a Canadian politician, who was elected to the Legislative Assembly of Saskatchewan in the 2020 Saskatchewan general election. She represents the electoral district of Regina University as a member of the Saskatchewan New Democratic Party caucus.

Career 
Prior to her election to the legislature, Young served on Regina's public school board, and owned and operated a gourmet cheese shop. She was pregnant during the election campaign, and gave birth to a daughter the day before the election.

She defeated Tina Beaudry-Mellor, the incumbent MLA from the Saskatchewan Party.

On November 4, 2020, Young was named NDP critic for Economy and Jobs, Immigration, Trade, Sask Builds, Central Services, SGI, and Sask Power, in addition to serving as the NDP deputy House Leader.

Electoral history

References

External links 

 Campaign trail for the 2020 general election by CBC News

Living people
Year of birth missing (living people)
21st-century Canadian politicians
21st-century Canadian women politicians
Saskatchewan New Democratic Party MLAs
Women MLAs in Saskatchewan
Politicians from Regina, Saskatchewan
Cheesemakers